Vadgaon Budruk also known as Vadgaon in the local area is one of the many upcoming suburbs of Pune, Maharashtra, India. It is located on Sinhgad Road.

Location & History
Vadgaon Budruk village is situated about 8 km from center of Pune. It was a very small village before 1990 with farming being main economic activity. Vadgaon Budruk has catchment area in western hills and which brought good soil as well as sufficient water for farming. The village took the name of Vadgaon as it has a number of "Vad"/ Banyan trees. With a dense forest in proximity to river and creek areas, Vadgaon Budruk was one of the stops during sheep migration from Konkan to regions inland. Vadgaon Budruk can be seen directly as a communication point between Sinhgad fort and Pune city. It is known for the Sinhgad Institute & also popular as with middle-class families. Nowadays it is well known place in the IT industry as many IT & BPO employees reside in the area.

Vadgaon Budruk saw lot of change after 2005, with significant increase in population of Pune. The change from village to suburb took toll on environment. Major part of the forest, fertile lands were converted to apartment complexes of concrete and tar. Most of the land in Vadgaon Budruk is now occupied by housing complexes. This is one of the important bases of Pune middle-class people.

In this area, most of the population is Maharashtrian. And it is easily accessible area for people from Satara, Sangli & Kolhapur district.

Transport

Vadgaon Budruk has excellent connectivity to Pune city via PMPML, buses, auto etc. There are frequent buses from Swargate to Dhayari. The city is very close to Pune-Bangalore highway and has good connectivity at both sides. Uber and Ola cabs are also available in this area.

Health
Kashibai Navle Hospital, Narhe
Sinhgad Dental College
Deenanath Mangeshkar Hospital, Erandwane
Cipla Foundation for Cancer
Shinde Hospital
Mai Mangeshkar Hospital
Vinayak Hospital
Lodha Hospital
Madhukar Hospital (Gynaecologist)
Mankar Hospital (Child specialist)
Jagtap Hospital

See also 
 Pune
 List of neighbourhoods in Pune

Neighbourhoods in Pune